The depictions of women in film noir come in a range of archetypes and stock characters, including the alluring femme fatale.

The main archetypes of female roles in film noir can be divided into two categories: the girl-next-door and the femme fatale.

The girl-next-door 
Her character archetype is depicted as ordinary, often overshadowed by the femme fatale. She is known to be honest, innocent, and sweet. She tends to meet traditional American standards of beauty and social expectations of how to behave. The girl-next-door often does refer to the fact she lives right next door to the male protagonist, possibly having known him their entire lives.
Her character represents the love that has always been there but unnoticed by the male protagonist. She is often overlooked and dismissed as a love interest by him. It is usually only when the male protagonist has gone through a series of obstacles with the femme fatale, that the truth is revealed that the girl-next-door has been there all along, ready to love the male protagonist.  An example of this is in Cathy O’Donnell’s portrayal of Keechie in They Live by Night (Ray, 1948).

The femme fatale 
The femme fatale, considered by many the central figure of film noir, is mysterious and enchanting. She is known for using her mind and body strategically in order to seduce men into compromising and often deadly situations. Her character is independent with undoubting sexual confidence and a laconic personality. The femme fatale does things by her own book, rejecting social expectations even if it deems her as immoral and/or bad.

Tactics 
A main tactic of the femme fatale is to use her feminine body and sexual traits as a way to achieve some hidden agenda.

The femme fatale is a prevalent and indicating theme to the style of film noir. The archetype of the femme fatale often pushes back on the male protagonist, posing as the obstacle to the protagonist in reaching their goals. In understanding dramatic structure, the dramatic action reveals the deep desires and goals of the characters who move the plot ahead. Therefore, the objectives and obstacles create complications and unraveling, the femme fatale is the epitome of complication and unraveling. A characteristic of the femme fatale is she often uses her sexuality and beauty to undermine another character in order to get what she wants.

Some of the most notorious femmes fatales in classical film noir are Barbara Stanwyck as Phyllis Dietrichson in Double Indemnity (Wilder, 1944), Rita Hayworth in Gilda (1946), and Lana Turner in The Postman Always Rings Twice (1946).

History

Myths and legends of femme fatale 
The archetype femme fatale has historically been a culturally pervasive influence on literature and art. Femme fatale has roots in mythology and legends through figures such as Eve from the Biblical creation narrative and the original sin story of Adam and Eve; mythological figures such as Circe and Clytemnestra; folklore, in figures like succubi and yuki-onna; and even history, in an understanding of figures like Cleopatra, Lucrezia Borgia, and Mata Hari. In these representations, the femme fatale possesses an allure that is able to enchant and hypnotize her victim, sometimes even through a metaphysical or supernatural force; akin to a witch, seductress, or enchantress. What seems to motivate the femme fatale is an insatiable desire for power and control, often over a man, weaponizing her charm and beauty while using lies, deception, and coercion.

Cultural context

World War II 
Though World War II is not often present in the plot lines of film noir, scholars suggest that the war period is important to the configuration of gender identity and gendered hierarchies in American society. During wartime, women entered what previously were male-dominated job positions, earning higher wages than ever before. Postwar retrenchment intended to restore jobs back to men and shift women to lower-paid positions or domestic roles. Sylvia Harvey examined these social shifts in regards to film noir and writes, “These economic changes forced certain changes in the traditional organization of the family; and the underlying sense of horror and uncertainty in film noir may be seen, in part, as an indirect response to this forcible assault on traditional family structures and the traditional and conservative values which they embodied.” 

World War II marked a significant turning point of the feminist movement. Societal gender roles were starting to be examined and this is believed to be a wave that swept of 1940s cinema leading to exploring how women function in film, a movement that critics and scholars could both agree pushed the expected boundaries of female characters.

Patriarchy 
Patriarchy is another social system being examined in film noir. Malu Barroso, author at High On Films writes, "As the patriarchal social order tried to reinstate itself when the war was over. Within the stylistic norms of the noir genre, the rough lighting and the gloomy visual clues of danger reflects the unsettling, broken domestic order, highlighting to the audience the tension in the home and the women’s role in triggering the narrative." Female characters in film noir represent a disturbance to male protagonists and the heteronormative patriarchal order, one that loses its control over women and  the female character gains her own power.

Postwar film noir of the 1940s is believed to be a direct reflection of the dark reality of a postwar culture and the reality of the re-oppressed woman. Financial independence and freedom through the workforce was being taken back by the patriarchal system.

Feminist theory and criticism 

Film Noir is understood as not a genre but an adaptable film style. As film scholar Raymond Durgnat points out, film noir is a point in film history, not a genre. Influenced by German Expressionism film, Hollywood took the aesthetics of forties and fifties, as dark, urban landscapes, fused with crime and mystery. How the women were portrayed in film noir helped to fuel the narrative with plot twists and deception.

Much feminist interest comes from understanding how the female form is being used and what that represents. Feminist theory within the context of film noir often seeks to understand themes such as gender identity, sexuality, in relation to representation and power. Theorists and scholars explore both the problematic and beneficial implications to portrayals of women in film noir.

Janey Place writes in Women in Film Noir  that “film noir is a male fantasy, as is most of our art.” She explains that noir’s female villains are central to the frame in the stylistic choices of the genre. She goes on to write that it is, “one of the few periods of film in which women are active, not static symbols, are intelligent and powerful, if destructively so, and derive power, not weakness, from their sexuality.”

Mary Ann Doane writes, “She is not the subject of feminism but a symptom of male fears about feminism. Nevertheless, the representation – like any representation –is not totally under the control of its producers and, once disseminated, comes to take on a life of its own.”

Kate Stables writes that “the postmodern fatal woman is a creature of excess and spectacle, like the films she decorates.”

Notable films

Films of the 40s- 50s 
Murder My Sweet (Edward Dmytryk, 1944)

Laura (Otto Preminger, 1944)

Mildred Pierce

The Maltese Falcon

Scarlet Street

Kiss Me Deadly

Detour (Edgar G Ulmer, 1945)

Gilda (1946)

The Postman Always Rings Twice (1946)

The Lady from Shanghai (1947)

Neo-Film Noir 70s- contemporary  
Klute (1971)

Across 110th Street (1972)

Chinatown (1974)

Taxi Driver (1976)

Body Heat

Fatal Attraction (1987)

Basic Instinct (1992)

Wild Things (1998)

Brick

Gone Girl (2014)

Atomic Blonde (2017)

Red Sparrow (2018)

Ocean’s Eight (2018)

Hustlers (2019)

References 

Film noir